South Delhi Municipal Corporation (SDMC) was one of the municipal corporations in Delhi, India created after the former Municipal Corporation of Delhi was trifurcated in 2012.

It was one of five local bodies in the National Capital Territory of Delhi, the others being North Delhi Municipal Corporation, East Delhi Municipal Corporation, New Delhi Municipal Council and Delhi Cantonment Board at that time.

On 22 May 2022 the three erstwhile Municipal corporations i.e. North Delhi, South Delhi and East Delhi was reunified into Municipal Corporation of Delhi.

List of Mayors

References

Municipal corporations in Delhi
2012 establishments in Delhi